Leslie George Santos (born 20 July 1967) is a former Hong Kong professional footballer who was widely regarded as one of the best attacking midfielder players in Hong Kong football history. He is of Portuguese and British heritage.

Career
During his peak (1983–1997), Santos played for South China Athletic Association. His career was disrupted by two cruciate ligament injuries to his left knee after tearing it in the final match of the 1992-1993 season against British Forces which sidelined him for eight months, and then tearing it again during a league match against Sing Tao in 1993–1994 after a heavy tackle by Ian Docker which took 3 years for rehabilitation. He was twice awarded Footballer of the year and he rounded off his career with Sun Hei.

Santos took over as coach for Sun Hei in the 2008-09 Hong Kong League Cup and took them to victory in the final over TSW Pegasus FC where they won 6:4 on penalties after the match finished 2:2, thus ending his coaching career in glory. Santos was award Best Coach of the Year for this victory. Santos was surprised by the award because he only coached for a short time.

Retirement
He is now a columnist for the Oriental Daily newspaper and runs his own soccer academy named after himself, known as Santos Soccer Training Limited Hong Kong. In December 2009, the school reached a long term agreement with ChelseaFC in 2009 to develop its first ever Soccer School in Asia to provide football and charity opportunities to children. The school is now known as ChelseaFC Soccer School (HK). It is based in Lam Tin, Kowloon with its own Blue Pitch training ground. They also have a new campus in Kwun Tong. In 2020, Leslie Santos was interviewed by the South China Morning Post to speak about the impact of the Covid-19 pandemic on his Soccer School.

Personal life
Santos is married and on 29 August 2010, his wife gave birth to a daughter. This was his second daughter.

References

External links
 FIFA Stats
 HK football – Interview with Leslie Santos

Hong Kong footballers
Hong Kong international footballers
Hong Kong football managers
1967 births
Living people
Association football midfielders
South China AA players
Hong Kong people of Portuguese descent
Sun Hei SC players
Hong Kong First Division League players
Hong Kong people of British descent